Ronald Smith (born August 18, 1978) is a former American football defensive tackle who played for the Cincinnati Bengals in 2002. He played college football at Lane University.

References 

1978 births
Living people
American football defensive tackles
Lane Dragons football players
Cincinnati Bengals players
Cologne Centurions (NFL Europe) players